The 2019 BNP Paribas Primrose Bordeaux is a professional tennis tournament played on clay courts. It is the twelfth edition of the tournament and part of the 2019 ATP Challenger Tour. It takes place in Bordeaux, France between 29 April and 5 May 2019.

Singles main-draw entrants

Seeds

 1 Rankings are as of 22 April 2019.

Other entrants
The following players received wildcards into the singles main draw:
  Pierre Delage
  Laurent Lokoli
  Matteo Martineau
  Lucas Pouille
  Jo-Wilfried Tsonga

The following player received entry into the singles main draw as a special exempt:
  Oscar Otte

The following players received entry into the singles main draw using their ITF World Tennis Ranking:
  Raúl Brancaccio
  Evan Furness
  Grégoire Jacq
  Karim-Mohamed Maamoun
  Oriol Roca Batalla

The following players received entry from the qualifying draw:
  Hugo Nys
  Albano Olivetti

Champions

Singles

 Lucas Pouille def.  Mikael Ymer 6–3, 6–3.

Doubles

 Grégoire Barrère /  Quentin Halys def.  Romain Arneodo /  Hugo Nys 6–4, 6–1.

References

External links
Official Website

2019 ATP Challenger Tour
2019
2019 in French tennis
April 2019 sports events in France
May 2019 sports events in France